The bendir (plural banadir) is a wooden-framed frame drum of North Africa and Southwest Asia.

The bendir is a traditional instrument that is played throughout North Africa, as well as in Sufi ceremonies; it was played, too, in Ancient Egypt and Mesopotamia. In Turkish, the word bendir means "a big hand frame drum".

Construction and play

The bandir often has a snare (usually made of gut) stretched across the head, which gives the tone a buzzing quality when the drum is struck with the fingers or palm. The drum is played in a vertical position. One holds the drum by looping the thumb of the non-dominant hand through a hole in the frame.

Similar frame drums include the tar of Egypt and the bodhrán of Ireland. Unlike the bendir, the tar does not have a snare on the back of the frame, and the bodhrán is played with a beater.

See also

Daf
Riq
Mazhar
Davul
Long drum

References

External links
 Bendir at Eckermann Drums Austria

African drums
Medicine drums
Hand drums
North African musical instruments
Tuareg musical instruments
Tunisian musical instruments
Algerian musical instruments
Arabic musical instruments
Turkish musical instruments
Instruments of Ottoman classical music
Instruments of Turkish makam music
Berber musical instruments